Pradhuman Singh Tomar is an Indian politician. He is the member of Bharatiya Janata Party. He is currently Energy minister of Madhya Pradesh in Shivraj Singh Chouhan's 2020 Cabinet. He was a Member of Madhya Pradesh Legislative Assembly from Gwalior in Gwalior from December 2018 to March 2020. And he also served as Member of legislative assembly in 2008 from Gwalior. Shri Tomar comes from Scindia Circle and known as Scindia samarthak.

See also
 2020 Madhya Pradesh political crisis

References

Contact Dharmenda Mishra

Living people
Madhya Pradesh MLAs 2008–2013
1954 births
Indian National Congress politicians from Madhya Pradesh
Madhya Pradesh MLAs 2018–2023
People from Gwalior